The dark-faced ground tyrant (Muscisaxicola maclovianus) is a small passerine bird belonging to the tyrant flycatcher family. It is a ground-dwelling bird that breeds in the southern Andes region and the  Falkland Islands. It feeds on small invertebrates such as flies and moths.

Description 
It is 16 cm long with the male being slightly larger than the female. Like other ground tyrants, it has long legs and an upright posture. The plumage is mainly dark grey-brown above and pale greyish below with a dark brown crown and a blackish face. The rump and tail are black with white outer tail-feathers. The legs and bill are black. Birds on the Falkland Islands (M. m. maclovianus) are larger and greyer than those in mainland South America (M. m. mentalis).

The song is a weak twittering which may be uttered on the ground or in flight.

Habitat and range 
The species breeds in southern parts of Chile and Argentina and on the Falkland Islands. It inhabits open areas from sea-level up to 1500 m in the Andes. In the austral winter some birds migrate north as far as Uruguay, northern Argentina and Peru. At this season it moves down to lowland areas and may visit farmland, gardens and beaches.

Reproduction 
The nest is placed among rocks and is made of grass and root fibres with a lining of wool or feathers. The two or three eggs are white with red-brown spots. Two broods are probably raised during the breeding season.

References 

 Jaramillo, Alvaro; Burke, Peter & Beadle, David (2003) Field Guide to the Birds of Chile, Christopher Helm, London
 Woods, Robin W. (1988) Guide to Birds of the Falkland Islands, Anthony Nelson, Oswestry

External links 
 "Dark-faced ground tyrant" videos on the Internet Bird Collection

 Photograph of a dark-faced ground tyrant
 Stamps (for Falkland Islands) with RangeMap
 "Dark-faced ground tyrant" photo gallery VIREO

Muscisaxicola
Birds of Chile
Birds of the Falkland Islands
Birds of Tierra del Fuego
Birds described in 1829
Taxa named by Prosper Garnot